Star lily or starlily is a common name for several plants and may refer to:

 Hypoxis, a plant genus also known as star grass containing such examples as 
 Various plant species in the Melanthieae, also known as "deathcamas" including 
 Leucocrinum montanum, a plant species of western North America